Vasaplatsen is a triangular public square in the district of Vasastaden in Gothenburg, Sweden. Since two tram lines crosses here, there are four combined tram and bus stops on the square close by each other that all go under the name Vasaplatsen. All public trams and buses in Gothenburg are operated by Västtrafik.

In 1992, 13 people lost their lives and around 30 people were injured when a driverless tram came down the hill from Kapellplatsen and collided with another tram at Vasaplatsen.

References 

Squares in Gothenburg